McAneeley is a surname. Notable people with the surname include:

Bob McAneeley (born 1950), Canadian ice hockey player
Ted McAneeley (born 1950), Canadian ice hockey player

See also
McNeeley